National figure skating championships of the 2019–20 season took place mainly from December 2019 to January 2020. They were held to crown national champions and served as part of the selection process for international events, such as the 2020 ISU Figure Skating Championships. Medals were awarded in the disciplines of men's singles, ladies' singles, pair skating, and ice dance. A few countries chose to organize their national championships together with their neighbors; the results were subsequently divided into national podiums.

Competitions

Senior medalists

Men

Ladies

Pairs

Ice dance

Junior medalists

Men

Ladies

Pairs

Ice dance

References 

Nationals
Nationals
Figure skating national championships